Gabriel Alexander Wright (born April 3, 1992) is an American football defensive tackle for the DC Defenders of the XFL. He played college football at Auburn and was drafted by the Detroit Lions in the fourth round of the 2015 NFL Draft. Wright has since been a member of several other NFL teams.

Professional career

Detroit Lions
Wright was drafted by the Detroit Lions in the fourth round (113th overall) of the 2015 NFL Draft after playing college football at Auburn. The Lions traded up for the pick, giving away their 2016 third-round pick to the Philadelphia Eagles. On September 3, 2016, he was waived by the Lions.

Cleveland Browns
September 5, 2016, Wright signed with the Cleveland Browns' practice squad. On September 13, 2016, he was promoted to the Browns' active roster. He was released on October 4, 2016 and re-signed to the practice squad the next day. He was elevated back to the active roster on October 11, 2016. He was released again on October 21, 2016 and re-signed back to the practice squad a few days later. He was re-signed back to the active roster again on December 13, 2016.

On May 19, 2017, Wright was waived by the Browns.

Philadelphia Eagles
On June 5, 2017, Wright was signed by the Philadelphia Eagles. He was waived by the team on September 1, 2017.

Miami Dolphins
On September 4, 2017, Wright was signed to the Miami Dolphins' practice squad. He was promoted to the active roster on December 28, 2017.

On August 14, 2018, Wright was released by the Dolphins.

Oakland Raiders
On August 15, 2018, Wright was claimed off waivers by the Oakland Raiders. He was waived on September 1, 2018 and was signed to the practice squad the next day. He was released on September 14, 2018, but was re-signed five days later. He was promoted to the active roster on December 18, 2018. Wright was waived during final roster cuts on August 30, 2019.

Houston Roughnecks
On November 22, 2019, Wright was drafted by the Houston Roughnecks in the 2020 XFL Supplemental Draft. In 5 games for the undefeated Roughnecks, Wright produced 10 tackles and 1.5 sacks. He had his contract terminated when the league suspended operations on April 10, 2020.

Jacksonville Jaguars
On December 7, 2020, Wright signed with the practice squad of the Jacksonville Jaguars. He signed a reserve/future contract on January 4, 2021. He was waived on March 17, 2021.

Washington Football Team
Wright signed with the Washington Football Team on June 7, 2021. He was released on August 31, 2021, and re-signed to the practice squad the following day. Wright was released on September 28, 2021. He signed to the team's practice squad on November 16, 2021.

DC Defenders
Wright was placed on the reserve list by the DC Defenders of the XFL on March 7, 2023. He was activated a week later.

References

External links
Auburn Tigers bio

1992 births
Living people
American football defensive tackles
Auburn Tigers football players
Cleveland Browns players
DC Defenders players
Detroit Lions players
George Washington Carver High School (Columbus, Georgia) alumni
Miami Dolphins players
Oakland Raiders players
Philadelphia Eagles players
Players of American football from Columbus, Georgia
Houston Roughnecks players
Jacksonville Jaguars players
Washington Football Team players